The Lwów school of mathematics was a group of Polish mathematicians who worked in the interwar period in Lwów, Poland (since 1945 Lviv, Ukraine). The mathematicians often met at the famous Scottish Café to discuss mathematical problems, and published in the journal Studia Mathematica, founded in 1929. The school was renowned for its productivity and its extensive contributions to subjects such as point-set topology, set theory and functional analysis. The biographies and contributions of these mathematicians were documented in 1980 by their contemporary Kazimierz Kuratowski in his book A Half Century of Polish Mathematics: Remembrances and Reflections.

Members
Notable members of the Lwów school of mathematics included:

 Stefan Banach
 Feliks Barański
 Władysław Orlicz
 Stanisław Saks
 Hugo Steinhaus
 Stanisław Mazur
 Stanisław Ulam
 Józef Schreier
 Juliusz Schauder
 Mark Kac
 Antoni Łomnicki
 Stefan Kaczmarz
 Herman Auerbach
 Włodzimierz Stożek
 Stanisław Ruziewicz
 Eustachy Żyliński

The end of the school
Many of the mathematicians, especially those of Jewish background, fled this southeastern part of Poland in 1941 when it became clear that it would be invaded by Germany. Few of the mathematicians survived World War II, but after the war a group including some of the original community carried on their work in western Poland's Wrocław, the successor city to prewar Lwów; see Polish population transfers (1944–1946). A number of the prewar mathematicians, prominent among them Stanisław Ulam, became famous for work done in the United States.

See also
 Kraków School of Mathematics
 Lwów–Warsaw school
 Polish School of Mathematics
 Scottish Café
 Warsaw School of Mathematics

References

 

History of mathematics
History of education in Poland
History of Lviv
Science and technology in Poland
Lviv Polytechnic